This is a list of largest airlines active in South America (beyond 100 thousand passengers/year). It is ranked by number of carried passengers.

By passengers carried (millions)

Notes
 Includes LAN Airlines and TAM Airlines.
 Includes Gol Transportes Aéreos and VARIG.
 Includes Avianca Colombia, Avianca Peru, Avianca El Salvador, Avianca Costa Rica, Avianca Ecuador, Avianca Nicaragua,  Avianca Honduras and Avianca Guatemala.
 Includes Austral Líneas Aéreas.
 Includes TRIP Linhas Aéreas.
 Includes JetSmart Argentina and Norwegian Air Argentina.
 Includes VivaAir Colombia and Viva Air Peru.
 Includes Sky Airline Peru
 Includes MAP Linhas Aéreas 
 Includes Aerorepública and Copa Airlines Colombia (subsidiary of Copa Airlines) 

Information was updated on Feb, 2023

Ecuador, Paraguay and Uruguay have no airline relevant to the South America market. Venezuela's information is not available

References

Sources
Countries (every airline but LATAM and Avianca)
Argentina (ANAC), 
Brazil (ANAC), 
Bolivia (DGAC), 
Chile (JAC), 
Colombia (Aeronáutica Civil), 
Ecuador (DGAC), 
Paraguay (DINAC),
Peru (MTC),
Uruguay (DINACIA)

Airlines
Avianca Holdings
LATAM Group

South America
Airlines of South America
 Largest